Alexander Alcock was Dean of Lismore from 1725 until 1747: his son, John was Dean of Ferns from 1747 until 1769; while another, Alexander, was Archdeacon of Lismore from 1753 until 1787.

Notes

Alumni of Trinity College Dublin
Deans of Lismore